Sarduri IV (unknown–595 BC) was one of the last kings of Urartu, reigning from 615 to 595 BC.

Sarduri IV was the son and successor of Rusa III.  Little is known about his reign, except that his kingdom was being invaded by Assyrian forces from the south, east and west, as well as by the Medes from the east and the Scythians from the north.

He died without issue and was succeeded by his brother Rusa IV.

See also

 List of kings of Urartu

References

Further reading
 Boris Piotrovskii, The Ancient Civilization of Urartu, London, 1969.
 Igor Diakonoff, The Pre-History of the Armenian People, Caravan Books, New York, 1988.
 M. Chahin, The Kingdom of Armenia, Curzon, London, 2001.
 Գ. Ղափանցյան, Ուրարտուի պատմությունը, Yerevan, 1940, pp. 143–152 (in Armenian)
 Пиотровский Б. Б., Ванское царство (Урарту),  Moscow, 1959 (in Russian)
 Арутюнян Н. В., Биайнили (Урарту), Published by Academy of Sciences of Armenian SSR, Yerevan, 1970 (in Russian).
 Арутюнян Н. В., Некоторые вопросы последнего периода истории Урарту // Древний Восток, Published by Academy of Sciences of Armenian SSR, Yerevan, No. 2, 1976 (in Russian)
 Дьяконов И. М., Последние годы Урартского государства по ассиро-вавилонским источникам // Вестник Древней Истории, No 2, 1951 (in Russian)

Urartian kings
7th-century BC rulers
6th-century BC rulers